Key Haven is an unincorporated community on Raccoon Key, an island in the lower Florida Keys about a mile (1.6 km) east of the island of Key West. It is a suburb of greater Key West, and houses around a thousand residents. The city limits of Key West on northern Stock Island are separated from Key Haven by a channel about a quarter mile (400 m) wide.

It lies off the northeast side of Stock Island, and is connected by fill to U.S. 1 (the Overseas Highway) via Key Haven Road, its primary road, just east of mile marker 5.

Key Haven was chosen as the location of The Real World Key West, which appeared in 2006. The Real World home is located at the end of Driftwood Drive.

Nearly every car on the island was destroyed, and many homes were damaged.

References

Unincorporated communities in Monroe County, Florida
Suburbs of Key West
Unincorporated communities in Florida
Populated coastal places in Florida on the Atlantic Ocean